Isojacareubin is a xanthonoid natural product found in Hypericum japonicum.

It has been shown to have antibacterial activity. Isojacareubin also inhibits protein kinase C isoforms, and has activity in an animal model of hepatocellular carcinoma.

References 

Xanthonoids